By The Horns Brewing Co is a British microbrewery based in Summerstown, London and founded by Alex Bull and Chris Mills. There is a brewery tap bar and bottle shop at the same address.

Flagship beers
 Stiff Upper Lip
 Diamond Geezer
 Lambeth Walk
 Wolfie Smith
 Hopslinger American IPA
 2Tone London Lager
 The Mayor of Garratt
 Morning Glory Stout

In 2014, it was reported that the eponymous star of the 1977-80 TV sitcom Citizen Smith, actor Robert Lindsay, was requesting that the brewery cease to use an image of him on their Wolfie Smith beer, as he did not wish to be associated with an alcoholic beverage. By the Horns agreed to redesign the label.

Seasonal beers
Seasonal beers include:
Mick the Miller
Hopslinger Black
Bobby on the Wheat
Rum Ned
Vive La Brett

The company has also produced a seasonal Christmas stout.

See also
 List of microbreweries

References

External links

Breweries in London